William Arthur Moody (22 February 1895 – 1978) was an English footballer who played as an inside forward for Rochdale.

References

Rochdale A.F.C. players
Cardiff City F.C. players
Mid Rhondda F.C. players
English footballers
Footballers from Rochdale
1895 births
1978 deaths
Association footballers not categorized by position